Alfred Rhodes Bristow (20 December 1819 – 5 April 1875) was a British Liberal politician.

He was the son of Government contractor Isaac Bristow and educated at King's College, London. He became a solicitor in 1842 and was head of the firm of Bristow and Tarrant.

Bristow was elected Liberal MP for Kidderminster at the 1859 general election and held the seat until 1862, when he resigned, becoming Steward of the Chiltern Hundreds in order to take up a Crown office as Solicitor to the Admiralty.

He died at Sydenham railway station.

References

External links
 

1819 births
1875 deaths
Alumni of King's College London
British solicitors
Liberal Party (UK) MPs for English constituencies
UK MPs 1859–1865